Azmighan (also Romanized as Az̄mīghān; also known as Ezmīqān) is a village in Montazeriyeh Rural District, in the Central District of Tabas County, South Khorasan Province, Iran. At the 2006 census, its population was 223, in 68 families.

References 

Populated places in Tabas County